Andrej Brázda-Jankovský (or Andrej Brázda) (26 July 1915 – 2008) was a Canadian-based writer who wrote in Slovak.

Early life 
Andrej Brázda-Jankovský was born in 1915 in what is present-day Slovakia.

Career
He emigrated to Canada in 1968, where he lived and worked as a novelist and journalist.

Personal life
He was the father of Canadian folk musicians Bystrik and Andrew Brazda. He was the grandfather of artist Bozidar Brazda.

Death
He died in 2008 at the age of 93.

Work 
All of Brázda's works were written in Slovak. These included Vzbúrenec (The Rebel), Svedok Antónia (The Witness Antonia) and Kanadský Slovák (The Canadian Slovak).

References

External links 
 Biography 

Canadian male novelists
Slovak-language writers
1915 births
Czechoslovak emigrants to Canada
2008 deaths
20th-century Canadian novelists
20th-century Canadian male writers